Direct Action Against Drugs was a vigilante group in Northern Ireland that claimed responsibility for the killing of a number of alleged drug dealers. The organisation was allegedly a front name used by the Provisional IRA in claiming responsibility for the killings. It was made up of IRA active members exclusively.

List of suspected DAAD attacks 1995–2001
December 1995
Martin McCrory, a small-time drug dealer killed at his home in Turf Lodge, west Belfast.
 Chris Johnston (aged 38) was killed at his home off Ormeau Road, south Belfast.
Francis Collins, a former member of the IRA, was killed at his chip shop in New Lodge, Belfast.
January 1996
Ian Lyons died 2 January 1996, one day after being shot while sitting in a parked car outside a friend's home, Conor Park, Lurgan, County Armagh.
September 1996
 Séan (John) Devlin, killed in Friendly Street, Markets, south Belfast.
February 1998
Brendan Campbell (aged 30), a convicted drug dealer, was shot dead outside a restaurant in south Belfast.
May 1999
Brendan Joseph Fegan (aged 24), who had been described as one of Northern Ireland's main drug dealers, was shot 16 times by two gunmen in the Hermitage Bar, Newry.
June 1999
Paul Downey (aged 37), a suspected drug dealer from Newry, was shot dead, allegedly by DAAD.
April 2001
Christopher O'Kane was gunned down as he returned to his home in the Currynieran estate, Derry, on 21 April 2001.

See also
Republican Action Against Drugs (RAAD)

References

Front organizations
Provisional Irish Republican Army
Vigilantes
Illegal drug trade in the United Kingdom
Paramilitary punishment attacks in Northern Ireland